The following is a list of awards and nominations received by American actress and filmmaker Angelina Jolie. She has won three Golden Globe Awards, two Screen Actors Guild Awards, and an Academy Award for Best Supporting Actress for her performances in the films George Wallace (1997), Gia (1998), and Girl, Interrupted (1999). Her later performances as Mariane Pearl in A Mighty Heart (2007) and Christine Collins in Changeling (2008) earned her additional nominations, including an Academy Award for Best Actress nomination for the latter. For her roles in the action films Sky Captain and the World of Tomorrow (2004), Mr. & Mrs. Smith (2005), Wanted (2008), and The Tourist (2010), Jolie received awards based on popular votes, including an MTV Movie Award, two People's Choice Awards, and four Teen Choice Awards. In 2013, she received the Jean Hersholt Humanitarian Award.

Major associations

Academy Awards

BAFTA Awards

Primetime Emmy Awards

Golden Globe Awards

Screen Actors Guild Awards

Other awards and nominations

Blockbuster Entertainment Awards

Empire Awards

MTV Movie Awards

NAACP Image Awards

Nickelodeon Kids' Choice Awards

People's Choice Awards

Golden Raspberry Awards

Satellite Awards

Saturn Awards

Teen Choice Awards

Film critic awards

Film festival awards

Miscellaneous film awards

Humanitarian and other awards

Academy Awards

Alliance of Women Film Journalists EDA Awards

Other awards

Notes

See also
 Angelina Jolie filmography

References 

Jolie, Angelina
Awards